"Kâtibim" ("my clerk"), or "Üsküdar'a Gider İken" ("while going to Üsküdar") is a Turkish folk song about someone's clerk (kâtip) as they travel  to Üsküdar. The tune is a famous Istanbul türkü, which is spread beyond Turkey in many countries, especially in the Balkans.

Lyrics and score

Recordings

Recordings by Naftule Brandwein 
The melody was imported to North America in the 1920s. The renowned klezmer clarinetist and self-proclaimed “King of Jewish music” Naftule Brandwein recorded a purely instrumental version with the title “Der Terk in America” in 1924. Brandwein was born in Peremyshliany (Polish Galicia, now Ukraine) and emigrated to the USA in 1909 where he had a very successful career in the early 1920s.

Recordings by Safiye Ayla and similar versions 
A notable recording is that by Safiye Ayla from 1949. During the time of recording, Ayla was also a member of the assembly at the Istanbul City Conservatory. Classical composer Saygun included 'Variations on the Old Istanbul Folk Song Katibim (Varyasyonlar)' as the last part of his choral Op.22 Bir Tutam Kekik of 1943. Similar compositions  of Ayla's "Kâtibim" have followed it, including:

 With lyrics, and incorporating an English adaptation by Stella Lee, in 1953 the song was recorded in the USA as "Uska Dara - A Turkish Tale / Two Lovers" by Eydie Gormé and Eartha Kitt. The interpretation of the internationally known vocal star Eartha Kitt, accompanied by an instrumental set, could be based on that of Safiye Ayla.
 Other modern composers such as Ali Darmar have also arranged the tune.
 A very early publication for the Central European region took place from around 1960 by the second volume of the series of the UNESCO Commission European Songs in the Origins, whose song notation for "Üsküdara gideriken" goes back to a written source from 1952. It shows striking similarities with the version sung by Ayla.

Movie adaptations 
Alongside Ayla, Zeki Müren's recording of Kâtibim was also very popular. Müren appeared as an actor in the 1968 film "Kâtip (Üsküdar'a Giderken)" directed by Sadık Şendil , in which his recording played an important role and which became very popular in Turkey and the Turkish diaspora.

Adaptations from around the world
Many versions of the song can be found in countries neighboring Turkey and beyond, usually with entirely different lyrics. A documentary film entitled Whose is this song? and an international youth project called Everybody's Song documented many of these versions.

Europe 

Albania: The tune in Albanian is titled "Mu në bashtën tënde", which has some variations by different artists. In 1993, the song was said to be a part of the repertoire in Albania, for example, of the Roma musicians who tried to revive it in the traditional Turkish way.
Bosnia and Herzegovina: The Bosnian adaptations of the song include a traditional Sevdalinka known as "Pogledaj me Anadolko budi moja ti", meaning "Oh Anatolian girl, be mine" and a Qasida called "Zašto suza u mom oku", meaning "Why are my eyes weeping?".
Bulgaria: The melody comes in the form of a Bulgarian love song "Cerni oči imaš libe" (Bulgarian: "Черни очи имаш либе") and as a hymn of resistance to the Ottoman Empire in the Strandzha Mountains ("Ясен месец веч изгрява : "Jasen mesec več izgrjava").
Greece: In Greece, the song is known under different names, including: "Μικρό τρεχαντηράκι" ("Little trehantiri"), "Ήχασα μαντήλι" ("I lost a handkerchief"), "Στου Πάπα το μπουγάζι" ("In the Pope's strait"), "Ανάμεσα Τσιρίγο" ("Between Kythira"), "Από ξένο τόπο" ("From a foreign place"), "Από την Αθήνα ως τον Πειραιά" ("From Athens to Pireas"), "Ο Βαγγέλης" ("Vangelis"), and "Εσκουτάρι" ("Eskoutari"). One of the best known Greek interpreters of the song is Glykeria.
Hungary: Tamás Daróci Bárdos adapted the song with the title "Üszküdárá"
North Macedonia: A performance of the Macedonian version of the song ("Ој Девојче, Девојче") comes from the musician Toše Proeski (Тоше Проески), who was described by the BBC as "Elvis Presley of the Balkans", and who also worked as a UNICEF ambassador.
Romania: There is also a Romanian version of the song called "De ai ști, suflețelul meu" translated as "If you knew, my soul" collected and published by Anton Pann in the 1850s.
Serbia (Formerly Yugoslavia): Kâtibim in the Serbian version is called "Ruse kose curo imaš" (Serbian:"Ај, русе косе цуро имаш") meaning "Red hair you have, girl", traditionally sung in southeastern Serbian dialect. During the 1950s, the song has also been featured in the popular Yugoslav film "Ciganka" (Serbian: "Циганка") meaning "Gypsy". There is another version in Serbian titled "Poletela dva bijela goluba" meaning "Two white doves are flying" (recording from 1910)

Middle East 

 A multilingual version called "Fel Shara" exists, with lyrics in Arabic, French, Italian, Spanish and English. It was popularized by Gloria Levy, where it appeared as a track on her album "Sephardic Folk Songs".
 A traditional folk song in the Arab world with the same melody is known as "Ya Banat Iskandaria" (Arabic: "يا بنات اسكندريّة") meaning "Oh Girls of Alexandria". The song was later recorded by Lebanese Mohammed El-Bakkar around 1957 in his album named "Port Said".
 Another Arabic version of the Levantine folklore, mostly sung as part of the Aleppine genre, is "Ghazali Ghazali" (Arabic:"غزالي غزالي") meaning "My Gazelle".
 The melody is shared by "Talama Ashku Gharami" (Arabic: "طالما أشكو غرامي"), a traditional Arabic poem or Qasida for Prophet Muhammad and is similar to the Hebrew piyut Yigdal. It is said to be "deeply moving expression of infatuation, longing and yearning for the Prophet ﷺ".
There is also another Arabic adaptation by Al Mulla Othman Al Mosuli named Ya Athouli la taloumni (يا عذولي لا تلمني).

Central and Southern Asia 

Afghanistan: Another version of the melody is known from Afghanistan , which was sung by Uzbek singer Taaj Mohammad.
 Bangladesh: The Bengali adaptations of this tune known as "Tri-vuboner priyo Muhammad" (Bengali: "ত্রিভুবনের প্রিয় মোহাম্মদ") and "Shukno patar nupur paye" (Bengali: "শুকনো পাতার নূপুর পায়ে") in 1935s were composed by the national poet Kazi Nazrul Islam. It is thought that he learned the melody while he was fighting in the Middle East during World War I. As implied by its name, "Tri-vuboner priyo Muhammad''" is also an Islamic Song about Prophet Muhammad.
Pakistan: A Turkish-Urdu mash-up version titled "Ishq Kinara - Üsküdar'a Gider Iken" was performed on the Pakistani television program Coke Studio by Sumru Ağıryürüyen and Zoe Vicajji in 2013.
India: In the 1956 Indian film Taj, there is a Hindi-language song titled "Jhoom Jhoom Kar Chali Akeli" by Hemanta Mukherjee, which has similarity with Katibim. In the 2012 Indian film Agent Vinod there is a Hindi-language song titled "I'll Do the Talking"; the song is a partial interpolation of "Rasputin". Kâtibim's original tune is easily guessed in this song.

 Southeast Asia 

Indonesia: The melody of this song is used for Banser march, with modified lyrics.
Malaysia and Singapore: Alangkah Indah di Waktu Pagi (A Beautiful Morning) in Ali Baba Bujang Lapok is a song originally tuned from "Kâtibim".

 Modern adaptations 

Loreena McKennitt's studio album An Ancient Muse (2006) has a track named "Sacred Shabbat", which has the same tune as Kâtibim.
Jamaican artist Ken Boothe recorded the song as "Artibella".
Sami Yusuf's album Barakah (2016) has a track called "I Only Knew Love ('Araftul Hawa)" is also based on a similar tune.
 The third movement of Fazil Say's violin concerto "1001 Nights in the Harem"'' heavily quotes the tune.
The melody in Boney M's 1978 Euro disco hit single "Rasputin" has been compared to that of Kâtibim, but the band denied any similarity.
The video game Civilization VI's theme song for Arabia is based on Ya Banat Iskandaria.

References

External links

 YouTube - Ishq Kinara - Üsküdar'a Gider Iken
 YouTube - Nazrul Song - Tri-vuboner prio Muhammad. Naat-e-rasul bangla
 YouTube - Nazrul Song - Shukno Patar Nupur paye
 YouTube - Jhoom Jhoom Kar Chali Akeli by Hemanta Mukherjee
 YouTube - Γλυκερία - Από ξένο τόπο | Glykeria - Apo kseno topo - Official Audio Release
 YouTube - Violeta Tomovska - Oj devojce (ti tetovsko jabolce) 
 YouTube - Dön Bak Aynaya 
 YouTube - Ο ΒΑΓΓΕΛΗΣ, 1928, ΑΓΓΕΛΙΚΗ ΚΑΡΑΓΙΑΝΝΗ
 YouTube - Gloria Levy - Fel Sharah Canet Betet Masha (Walking Down the Street)

Turkish folk songs